The 32nd Indian Armoured Division was an armoured division of the Indian Army during World War II. It was formed in April 1941 as the 2nd Armoured Division and renamed the 32nd in December. It never saw any combat and was broken up to form the 44th Armoured Division in February 1943.

Formation

254th Indian Tank Brigade
7th Light Cavalry
25th Dragoons
46th Cavalry

255th Indian Tank Brigade 
26th Hussars
45th Cavalry
4/4th Bombay Grenadiers
158th Regiment RAC
159th Regiment RAC
5th King Edward's Own Probyn's Horse
9th Royal Deccan Horse
116th Regiment RAC
19th King George's Own Lancers

73rd Indian Infantry Brigade
The brigade was formed in July 1942, at Poona in India. The brigade was supposed to be the Infantry brigade component of the 32nd Indian Armoured Division, but was disbanded in April 1943, when the armoured division was disbanded.

14/15th Punjab Regiment
15/7th Rajput Regiment
15/10th Baluch Regiment

Divisional troops 
7th Anti Tank Regiment, Indian Artillery 
123rd Field Regiment,  Royal Artillery
33rd Field Squadron, Indian Engineers (IE)
36th Field Squadron, IE
40th Field Park Squadron, IE

References

Indian World War II divisions
British Indian Army divisions
Military units and formations established in 1941
Military units and formations of the British Empire in World War II